Hanjiang  railway station is a railway station located in the Hanjiang District of Putian City, Fujian Province, China, on the Fuzhou–Xiamen railway operated by the Nanchang Railway Bureau, China Railway Corporation.

References 

Railway stations in Fujian